As an overseas départment of France, Martinique's culture is French and Caribbean. Its former capital, Saint-Pierre (destroyed by a volcanic eruption), was often referred to as the Paris of the Lesser Antilles. The official language is French, although many Martinicans speak a Creole patois. Based in French, Martinique's Creole also incorporates elements of English, Spanish, Portuguese, and African languages. Originally passed down through oral storytelling traditions, it continues to be used more often in speech than in writing.

Most of Martinique's population is descended from African slaves brought to work on sugar plantations during the colonial era, white slave owners or from Carib or Kalinago people. 

Today, the island enjoys a higher standard of living than most other Caribbean countries. French products are easily available. Following French custom, many businesses close at midday, then reopen later in the afternoon. Among young people, studying in France is common. For the French, Martinique has been a vacation hotspot for many years, attracting both the upper class and more budget-conscious travelers.

Music

Music contributes a great deal to Martinique's culture. The most popular style is zouk, which originated in Martinique and Guadeloupe by combining elements of a number of musical styles from the Caribbean and United States.  Its biggest influence was biguine, which was popular dance orchestra music from the 1930s to 1950s. Zouk today has evolved from big band ensembles to smaller, electronically peppered bands.  Musicians use synthesizers, DIGITAL samplers, and drum machines, which they program to sound like native percussion instruments.

Another favorite musical genre, bèlè is an early form of biguine which incorporates group dance and song accompanied by drumming, often led in a call and response style. For most of the year, local music dominates.  But during Carnival, other music like calypso and soca can be heard as well.

Festivals
Martinique's version of Carnival, is a four-day event beginning just before Lent and ending on its first day, with the burning of Vaval, a papier-mâché figure symbolizing Carnival.  Businesses close during Carnival.

Like other Caribbean Carnivals, Martinique's is a high-energy event with parades, singing, drums, and other festivities.  People dress up in costumes, with devils and she-devils being especially popular. During Carnival in Martinique, many men parade in drag queen costume, sometimes with very elaborate and provocative outfits, with no obvious hint at alternative sexuality. It must be mentioned that traditionally, some women dressed as men for burlesque weddings on Monday. The high presence of men in drag is a reference to the central role of women in Martinique's society and family structure.

Towns throughout Martinique elect their own Carnival Queen, Mini-Queen, and Queen Mother.

Halfway through Lent, Martinicans take a break from abstinence with the one-day holiday Micarême.  The one-day mini-Carnival features dances, parties, and similar activities.  Afterward, people return to their repentance until Easter begins.

Just as in France, every year on November 21, Martinique celebrates the release of the year's Beaujolais nouveau.  In odd-numbered years in early December, the island hosts its prestigious Jazz à la Martinique.  Both top local talent and internationally known musicians like Branford Marsalis perform at this jazz festival. Jazz Festivals all over the Caribbean are very enjoyable.

Cuisine
French and Creole cuisine dominate Martinique's culinary landscape.  The two styles also combine by using French techniques with local produce, such as breadfruit, cassava, and christophine (chayote).  Creole dishes rely heavily on seafood, including curries and fritters.  An exception is boudin, a Creole type of blood sausage.  A dash of Chien sauce (made from onions, shallots, peppers, oil, and vinegar) adds a spicy touch to meals.  The favored island drink, Ti punch, is a mixture of five parts of white rum to one part sugarcane syrup. Crêperies, brasseries, and restaurants featuring cuisine from various French regions can be found all over Martinique.

History of French Antilles culture
Pierre Belain d'Esnambuc was a French trader and adventurer in the Caribbean, who established the first permanent French colony, Saint-Pierre, on the island of Martinique in 1635. Belain sailed to the Caribbean in 1625, hoping to establish a French settlement on the island of St. Christopher (St. Kitts). In 1626 he returned to France, where he won the support of Cardinal Richelieu to establish French colonies in the region. Richelieu became a shareholder in the Compagnie de Saint-Christophe, created to accomplish this with d'Esnambuc at its head. The company was not particularly successful and Richelieu had it reorganized as the Compagnie des Îles de l'Amérique.  In 1635 d'Esnambuc sailed to Martinique with one hundred French settlers to clear land for sugarcane plantations.

After six months on Martinique, d'Esnambuc returned to St. Christopher, where he soon died prematurely in 1636, leaving the company and Martinique in the hands of his nephew, Du Parquet.  His nephew, Jacques Dyel du Parquet, inherited d'Esnambuc's authority over the French settlements in the Caribbean. In 1637, his nephew, Jacques Dyel du Parquet, became governor of the island. He remained in Martinique and did not concern himself with the other islands.

The French permanently settled on Martinique and Guadeloupe after being driven off Saint Kitts and Nevis (Saint-Christophe in French) by the British. Fort Royal (Fort-de-France) on Martinique was a major port for French battle ships in the region from which the French were able to explore the region. In 1638, Jacques Dyel du Parquet (1606-1658), nephew of Pierre Belain d'Esnambuc and first governor of Martinique, decided to have Fort Saint Louis built to protect the city against enemy attacks. From Fort Royal, Martinique, Du Parquet proceeded south in search for new territories and established the first settlement in Saint Lucia in 1643, and headed an expedition which established a French settlement in Grenada in 1649. Despite the long history of British rule, Grenada's French heritage is still evidenced by the number of French loanwords in Grenadian Creole, French-style buildings, cuisine and places name (For ex. Petit Martinique, Martinique Channel, etc.)

In 1642 the Compagnie des Îles de l'Amérique company received a twenty-year extension of its charter. The King would name the Governor General of the company, and the company the Governors of the various islands.  However, by the late 1640s, in France Mazarin had little interest in colonial affairs and the company languished. In 1651 it dissolved itself, selling its exploitation rights to various parties.  The du Paquet family bought Martinique, Grenada, and Saint Lucia for 60,000 livres.  The sieur d'Houël bought Guadeloupe, Marie-Galante, La Desirade and the Saintes. The Knights of Malta bought Saint Barthélemy and Saint Martin, which were made dependencies of Guadeloupe. In 1665, the Knights sold the islands they had acquired to the newly formed (1664) Compagnie des Indes occidentales.

Dominica is a former French and British colony in the Eastern Caribbean, located about halfway between the French islands of Guadeloupe (to the north) and Martinique (to the south). Christopher Columbus named the island after the day of the week on which he spotted it, a Sunday (domingo in Latin), 3 November 1493. In the hundred years after Columbus's landing, Dominica remained isolated. At the time it was inhabited by the Island Caribs, or Kalinago people, and over time more settled there after being driven from surrounding islands, as European powers entered the region. In 1690, French woodcutters from Martinique and Guadeloupe begin to set up timber camps to supply the French islands with wood and gradually become permanent settlers. France had a colony for several years,  they imported slaves from West Africa, Martinique and Guadeloupe to work on its plantations. In this period, the Antillean Creole language developed. France formally ceded possession of Dominica to Great Britain in 1763. Great Britain established a small colony on the island in 1805. As a result, Dominica speak English as an official language while Antillean creole is spoken as a secondary language and is well maintained due to its location between the French-speaking departments of Guadeloupe and Martinique.

In Trinidad, the Spanish who were in possession of the island, contributed little towards  advancements, with El Dorado the focus, Trinidad was perfect due to its geographical location. Because Trinidad was considered underpopulated, Roume de St. Laurent, a Frenchman living in Grenada, was able to obtain a Cédula de Población from the Spanish king Charles III on 4 November 1783. Following the cedula of population French planters with their slaves, free coloreds and mulattos from the French Antilles of Martinique, Grenada, Guadeloupe and Dominica migrated to the Trinidad. They too added to the ancestry of Trinidadians, creating the creole identity; Spanish, French, and Patois were the languages spoken. The Spanish also gave many incentives to lure settlers to the island, including exemption from taxes for ten years and land grants in accordance to the terms set out in the Cedula. These new immigrants establishing local communities of Blanchisseuse, Champs Fleurs, Paramin, Cascade, Carenage and Laventille. Trinidad's population jumped to over 15,000 by the end of 1789, from just under 1,400 in 1777. In 1797, Trinidad became a British crown colony, with a French-speaking population. This exodus was encouraged due to the French Revolution.

Carnival had arrived with the French, indentured laborers and the slaves, who could not take part in Carnival, formed their own, parallel celebration called canboulay (from the French cannes brulées, meaning burnt cane) - the precursor for Trinidad's carnival and has played an important role in the development of Trinidad's culture. During the carnival season, the slaves performed songs in tents called Kaiso - later Calypso tents. Many early kaiso or calypso were performed in the French creole language and led by a griot or chantwell. As Trinidad became a British colony, the chantwell became known as the calypsonian. The British government tried to ban the celebration of carnival due to its aggressive overtone; this led to canboulay Riots between the Afro-creoles and the police, which banned the use of Stick fighting and African percussion music in 1881. They were replaced by bamboo "Bamboo-Tamboo" sticks beaten together, which were themselves banned in turn. In 1937 they reappeared, transformed as an orchestra of frying pans, dustbin lids and oil drums. These steelpans or pans are now a major part of the Trinidadian music scene.

Calypso's early rise was closely connected with the adoption of Carnival by Trinidadian slaves, including canboulay drumming and the music masquerade processions. The French brought Carnival to Trinidad, and calypso competitions at Carnival grew in popularity, especially after the abolition of slavery in 1834. From Trinidad, the carnival, calypso and steel pan spread to the entire English speaking Caribbean islands. Calypso in the Caribbean includes a range of genres, including: the Benna genre of Antiguan and Barbudan music; Mento, a style of Jamaican folk music that greatly influenced ska and reggae; Ska, the precursor to rocksteady and reggae; Spouge, a style of Barbadian popular music.

In Dominica, the chanté mas and lapo kabwit tradition started to become dominated by imported calypso and steel pan music in the early 1960s. After a fire in 1963, the traditional carnival was banned, though calypso and steelpan continued to grow in popularity. Calypso appealed to Carnival-partygoers because the lyrical focus on local news and gossip was similar to that of chanté mas, despite a rhythmic pattern and instrumentation which contrast sharply with traditional Dominican "Mas Domnik" music. Many of the traditional chanté mas (masquerade song) were performed to the calypso beat and later the new reggae beat coming out of Jamaica.

Calypsonians and Calypso Monarch competitions emerged and became extremely popular. Steelbands emerged all around Dominica and the rest of the Caribbean islands. Calypso music has been popular in Dominica since the 1950s; the first Calypso King was crowned in 1959. Bands such as Swinging Stars, The Gaylords, De Boys an Dem, Los Caballeros and Swinging Busters surfaced and began to cut records. The emergence of radio, first WIDBS and later Radio Dominica helped to spread the music.

In the 1960s, a number of Haitian musicians to the French Antilles (Guadeloupe and Martinique) brought with them the kadans (another word named for the genre "compas"), a sophisticated form of music that quickly swept the island and helped unite all the former French colonies of the Caribbean by combining their cultural influences. Webert Sicot, the originator of cadence recorded three LPs albums with French Antilles producers: two with "Celini disques" in Guadeloupe and one with "Balthazar" in Martinique. Haitian compas or cadence bands were asked to integrate Antillean musicians. Consequently, the leading "Les Guais troubadours", with influential singer "Louis Lahens" along other bands, played a very important role in the schooling of Antilleans to the méringue compas or kadans music style. Almost all existing Haitian compas bands have toured these Islands that have since adopted the music and the dance of the meringue. These were followed by French Antillean mini-jazz artists like Les Gentlemen, Les Leopards, and Les Vikings de Guadeloupe.

In 1969, Gordon Henderson of Dominica decided that the French Overseas Department of Guadeloupe had everything he needed to begin a career in Creole music. From there, lead singer Gordon Henderson went on to found a kadans fusion band, the Vikings of Guadeloupe – of which Kassav' co-founder Pierre-Eduard Decimus was a member. At some point he felt that he should start his own group and asked a former school friend Fitzroy Williams to recruit a few Dominicans to complete those he had already selected. The group was named Exile One. The band added various Caribbean styles to their musical identity such as reggae, calypso and mostly cadence or compas as the band moved to Guadeloupe. In 1973, Exile One (based on the island of Guadeloupe) initiated a fusion of cadence and calypso "Cadence-lypso" that would later influence the creation of soca music. The Trinidadian Calypso and Haitian kadans or méringue were the two dominants music styles of Dominica so Exile One, that featured calypso, reggae and mostly kadans or compas, called its music Cadence-lypso however, most of the band's repertoire was kadans.

Later in 1975, Lord Shorty of Trinidad visited his good friend Maestro in Dominica where he stayed (at Maestro's house) for a month while they visited and worked with local kadans artists. You had Maestro experimenting with calypso and cadence ("cadence-lypso"). A year later Maestro died in an accident in Dominica and his loss was palpably felt by Shorty, who penned "Higher World" as a tribute. In Dominica, Shorty had attended an Exile One performance of cadence-lypso, and collaborated with Dominica's 1969 Calypso King, Lord Tokyo and two calypso lyricists, Chris Seraphine and Pat Aaron in the early 1970s, who wrote him some kwéyòl lyrics. Soon after Shorty released a song, "Ou Petit", with words like "Ou dee moin ou petit Shorty" (meaning "you told me you are small Shorty"), a combination of calypso, cadence and kwéyòl. Soca's development includes its fusion of calypso, cadence, and Indian musical instruments—particularly the dholak, tabla and dhantal—as demonstrated in Shorty's classic compositions "Ïndrani" and "Shanti Om".

Due to the popularity of Exile One, There was a virtual explosion of kadans bands from Dominica - Grammacks, Liquid Ice, Midnight Groovers, Black Affairs, Black Machine, Mantra, Belles Combo, Milestone, Wafrikai, Black roots, Black Blood, Naked Feet and Mammouth among others. Leading vocalists of the period include Gordon Henderson, Jeff Joseph, Marcel "Chubby" Marc, Anthony Gussie, Mike Moreau, Tony Valmond, Linford John, Bill Thomas, SinkyRabess and Janet Azouz among others. Dominican kadans bands became popular in Martinique, Guadeloupe, Haiti and other islands in the Caribbean and Africa.

The full-horn section kadans band Exile One led by Gordon Henderson was the first to introduce the newly arrived synthesizers to their music that other young cadence or méringue bands from Haiti (mini-jazz) and the French Antilles emulated in the 1970s. Gordon Henderson's Exile One turned the mini-jazz combos into guitar-dominated big bands with a full-horn section and the newly arrived synthesizers, paving the way for the success of large groups like Grammacks, Experience 7, among others. Drawing on these influences, the supergroup Kassav' invented zouk and popularized it in the 1980s.

Kassav' was formed in 1979 by Pierre-Edouard Décimus and Paris studio musician Jacob F. Desvarieux. Together and under the influence of well-known Dominican and Guadeloupean kadans-lypso or compas bands like Experience 7, Grammacks, Exile One and Les Aiglons they decided to make Guadeloupean carnival music recording it in a more fully orchestrated yet modern and polished style. Kassav' created its own style "zouk" by introducing an eleven-piece gwo ka unit and two lead singers, tambour bélé, ti bwa, biguine, cadence-lypso: calypso and mostly Cadence rampa or compas with full use of the MIDI technology. Kassav was the first band in the Caribbean to apply the MIDI technology to their music. In the 1980s they took Caribbean music to another level by recording in the new digital format. The style lost ground in the late 1980s due to the strong presence of cadence or compas, the main music of the French Antilles.

A special style within the zouk is "zouk love", characterized by a slow, soft and sexual rhythm. The inspiration for the zouk love style of rhythmic music comes from the Haitian compas, as well as music called cadence-lypso - Dominica cadence as popularized by Grammacks and Exile One. The lyrics of the songs often speak of love and sentimental problems.

The music kizomba from Angola and cola-zouk or cabo love from Cape Verde are derivatives of this French Antillean compas music style, which sounds basically the same, although there are notable differences once you become more familiar with these genres. A main exponent of this subgenre is Ophelia Marie of Dominica. Other Zouk Love artists come from the French West Indies, the Netherlands, and Africa.

In Brazil, the zouk rhythm is used to dance the Brazilian Lambada. Since adding many new steps and changing the characteristics from Lambada, a new name was given to this dance "Zouk-lambada", with was originally 'zouk Love', later just called 'zouk'. Today, the Brazilian Zouk has changed and thus, the name 'Traditional Zouk' has been given to the dance that was first taught by Adilio and Renata in the beginning of the 90's, which is now didactically used all over the world.

In the late 80's, the WCK or Windward Caribbean Kulture, was formed by a group of highly creative young Dominican musicians. The band heralded in a new and much needed resurgence of live music and created a new wave in Dominicas musical evolution. They began experimenting with a fusion of cadence-lypso, the native lapo kabwit drum rhythms and elements of the music of jing ping bands. This group came together to fill a void left by several of Dominica's most internationally recognized bands such as Exile One and Grammacks. While the Cadence-Lypso sound is based on the creative use of acoustic drums, an aggressive up-tempo guitar beat and strong social commentary in the native Creole language, the new sound created by WCK, focused more on the use of technology with a strong emphasis on keyboard rhythmic patterns.

The band played a blend of the local Cadence-lypso and traditional Jing ping, chanté mas and lapo kabwit rhythms, which would later be labelled "bouyon", a genre which they are credited with creating. Dominican-born Derick "Rah" Peters is considered to be one of the most influential figure in the development of the bouyon genre. Bouyon as popularized largely by the WCK band blends in jing ping, cadence-lypso, and traditional dances namely bèlè, quadrille, chanté mas and lapo kabwit, mazurka, zouk and other styles of caribbean music. From a language perspective, Bouyon draws on English and Kwéyòl.

Bouyon music is popular across the Caribbean, and is known as "bouyon gwada" or jump up music in Guadeloupe and Martinique. A popular offshoot within the bouyon gwada is called "bouyon hardcore", a style characterized by its lewd and violent lyrics. This musical style is characterized by texts "slackness" sexually explicit. It is a form of radicalized bouyon of Dominica. Some call it bouyon gwada (Guadeloupe bouyon) to mark its difference and its themes are often the same.

See also
Paul Gauguin Interpretation Centre

Further reading 
 Caribbean Currents: Caribbean Music From Rumba to Reggae, by Peter Manuel. Temple University Press, 1995.
 Fodor's Caribbean 2004.  Fodor's Travel Publications, 2004.